Syed Zainul Abedin is the Dewan (spiritual Head) of the Ajmer Sharif Dargah founded by Khawaja Moinuddin Chishti (Khwaja Gareeb Nawaz), according to the APEX Court of India. He is the successor of Khwaja Gareeb Nawaz, and is also known as Dargah Dewan (Dewan of Dargah), successor, Sajjadanashin (current head) of the Chishti order of Sufism, Gaddinashin, Pir and Sheikhul Mashaeikh Dewan Syed Zainul Abedin Ali Khan Sahib of the Ajmer Sharif Dargah.

Family
Syed Zainul Abedin is the direct family descendant as 22nd generation/ great grandson of Khwaja Moinuddin Chishti, is the lawful authority according to the Apex court of India and the provisions of the Dargah Khawaja Saheb Act, 1955.

Activities
He used to visit and speak publicly at various shrines and other places in India and abroad, on religious and national political affairs.also visited to Kanpur. Shiv Sena president Uddhav Thackeray said he should be awarded the Bharat Ratna award for his activities.

See also
 Moinuddin Chishti
 Ajmer Sharif Dargah
 Sufism
 Abdul-Qadir Gilani
 Baba Bhanderi
 Prophet's Day
 Ibn Arabi
 Dervish
 Fakir
 Ajmer

References

Sufism
Dargahs in India
Indian Sufis
Sufi shrines in India